The 1963–64 season was the 56th year of football played by Dundee United, and covers the period from 1 July 1963 to 30 June 1964. United finished in eighth place in the First Division.

Match results
Dundee United played a total of 48 competitive matches during the 1963–64 season.

Legend

All results are written with Dundee United's score first.
Own goals in italics

First Division

Scottish Cup

League Cup

Summer Cup

See also
 1963–64 in Scottish football

References

Dundee United F.C. seasons
Dundee United